The 1932 Summer Olympics (officially the Games of the X Olympiad and also known as Los Angeles 1932) were an international multi-sport event held from July 30 to August 14, 1932, in Los Angeles, California, United States. The Games were held during the worldwide Great Depression, with some nations not traveling to Los Angeles; 37 nations competed, compared to the 46 in the 1928 Games in Amsterdam, and even then-U.S. President Herbert Hoover did not attend the Games. The organizing committee did not report the financial details of the Games, although contemporary newspapers claimed that the Games had made a profit of US$1,000,000.

Host city selection
The selection of the host city for the 1932 Summer Olympics was made at the 23rd IOC Session in Rome, Italy, on 9 April 1923. Remarkably, the selection process consisted of a single bid, from Los Angeles, and as there were no bids from any other city, Los Angeles was selected by default to host the 1932 Games.

Highlights

Charles Curtis became the first and only United States vice-president to inaugurate the Olympic Games.
 An Olympic Village was built for the first time and became a model for future games, in Baldwin Hills, occupied by male athletes.  Female athletes were housed at the Chapman Park Hotel on Wilshire Boulevard.
 The victory podium was used for the first time at the summer games (a podium was also used earlier in the year at the 1932 Winter Olympics in Lake Placid).
 An Olympic mascot, Scottish Terrier Smoky, was featured for the first time in history. 
 The Los Angeles Memorial Coliseum was known in 1932 as Olympic Stadium.
 Tenth Street, a major thoroughfare in Los Angeles, was renamed Olympic Boulevard in honor of the Games of the Tenth Olympiad.
 Babe Didrikson won two gold medals in the javelin and the hurdles event. She also competed in a jump-off for a gold in the high jump. Her technique in the jump-off was ruled illegal, leaving Didrikson with second place.
 Paavo Nurmi was suspended from competition by the IAAF for alleged violation of amateur rules. Finns charged that the Swedish officials had used devious tricks in their campaign against Nurmi's amateur status, and ceased all athletic relations with Sweden. A year earlier, controversies on the track and in the press had led Finland to withdraw from the Finland-Sweden athletics international. After Nurmi's suspension, Finland did not agree to return to the event until 1939.
 In field hockey, only three nations took part. The host nation lost both matches, 1–24 to India and 2–9 to Japan, but still won a bronze medal.
 Poland's Stanisława Walasiewicz won the gold medal in the women's 100 m; she also won the silver medal in the event four years later. After her death in 1980, it was discovered that she was intersex and would have been ineligible to participate under modern rules.
 Eddie Tolan won both the 100 m and 200 m sprint events.
 Romeo Neri won three gold medals in gymnastics.
 Helene Madison won three gold medals in swimming, while the Japanese upset the men's events and took all but one title.
 Takeichi Nishi (Baron Nishi) was the gold medalist with his horse Uranus in the equestrian show jumping individual event. Nishi's gold medal is Japan's only gold medal in the equestrian event to this day.  Nishi died in 1945 as an officer stationed in the defense of the island of Iwo Jima, and as such is an important character in Clint Eastwood's film, Letters from Iwo Jima.
 Kusuo Kitamura won the gold medal in the men's 1500 meter freestyle swimming race. He was and continues to be the youngest ever male swimmer to win a gold medal at the Olympic Games.
 Dunc Gray won Australia's first cycling gold medal; he set a world record of 1m 13s in the 1000 time trial. The Dunc Gray Velodrome, built for the 2000 Sydney Olympic Games, was named after him.
 Due to an official's error, the 3,000 m steeplechase went for 3,460 m, or one extra lap.
 Although women's team gymnastics debuted in the previous Olympics, the event was not held in these games; however, there were women gymnasts who traveled to Los Angeles and participated in exhibition events at the 1932 games. 
Several women's events debuted at these games, among them the 80 meters hurdles and javelin throw. Babe Didrikson won both events and also competed in the high jump where she was controversially denied gold, leaving her with silver. As women, unlike men, were only allowed to enter a maximum of three events, Didrikson could not compete in the discus throw, long jump, and relay where she would have likely medaled based on her prior results. Had the 200 meters and pentathlon been contested at these games (they debuted in 1964), Didrikson would have won them easily based on her performances prior to the Olympics.

Medals awarded

117 events in 20 disciplines, comprising 14 sports, were part of the Olympic program in 1932. In one of two Equestrian jumping events (team competitions) no medals were awarded. The number of events in each discipline is noted in parentheses.

Aquatics

Road (2)
Track (4)

Dressage (2)
Eventing (2)
Show jumping (2)

Freestyle (7)
Greco-Roman (7)

Demonstration sports

Art
The Art competitions at the 1932 Summer Olympics awarded medals for works inspired by sport-related themes in five categories: architecture, literature, music, painting, and sculpture.

Venues

Fifteen sports venues were used for the 1932 Summer Olympics. In order to control costs in the wake of the Great Depression, existing venues were used. They included two golf courses, two city parks, three public highways, and a city road. The Swimming Stadium was the only new venue constructed for these games. The Rose Bowl, constructed in 1921, was made into a temporary velodrome for track cycling events under the auspices of the Union Cycliste Internationale (UCI). The Los Angeles Memorial Coliseum, constructed in 1923, was used as the Olympic Stadium. The Olympic Auditorium was constructed in 1924 in preparation for Los Angeles being awarded the Games; it was modified to meet the specifications of the boxing, weightlifting, and wrestling federations. Long Beach Marine Stadium was created in 1925 when Alamitos Bay was dredged, then further dredged seven years later in time for the 1932 Games. Elysian Park, the oldest city park in Los Angeles, was founded in 1886, and has been part of the Los Angeles Police Department (LAPD) training academy since 1925. The Riviera Country Club opened in 1926 as the Los Angeles Athletic Club Golf Course and was renamed Riviera by the time of the 1932 Games. The swimming stadium, constructed adjacent to the Coliseum in 1932, was intended to be a temporary structure. Riverside Drive, Los Angeles Avenue, Vineyard Avenue, and the Pacific Coast Highway were common driving routes in California at the time of the 1932 Games.

The Coliseum was the first home for the Dodgers Major League Baseball (MLB) team when it moved from Brooklyn, New York in the 1958 season. The following year, it hosted the MLB All-Star Game and the World Series. Once Dodger Stadium was completed in 1962, the Dodgers moved there where they have been since. The Los Angeles Rams National Football League (NFL) team used the Coliseum as its host stadium from 1946 to 1980 when it moved to Anaheim, located southeast of Los Angeles. It also hosted what became known as Super Bowl I in 1967. Even the American Football League's Chargers used the Coliseum as a venue in 1960 until their move to San Diego the following year.  The Coliseum continues to host USC Trojans football games to this day, and also hosted UCLA Bruins football for a number of years. The Rams returned to the Coliseum for a span of four years from 2016 to 2019.

The track constructed in the Rose Bowl was given to the Tournament of Roses Association upon completion of the 1932 Games. The Bowl was expanded between 1932 and the 1984 Summer Olympics three times, increasing its capacity from 83,000 in 1931 to 104,594 in 1972. It hosted Super Bowl XI in 1977, where the Oakland Raiders defeated the Minnesota Vikings 32–14.  It is the current home of UCLA Bruins football and the Rose Bowl Game, and was the home of the L.A. Galaxy soccer team for a number of years.

Elysian Park's shooting range was left intact for the LAPD to use. Sunset Fields Golf Club was renamed Brentwood Country Club in 1941 and is still in use as of 2010. All of the road courses were returned to public usage after the Olympics. The Olympic Auditorium continued to be of use for boxing and roller derby events until June 2005 when it was bought to be used as a megachurch. Los Angeles Harbor continues to be a major sea port in the Western United States, employing 919,000 people and generating US$39.1 billion in annual wages and tax revenues as of 2007. The Riveria Country Club continues to host golf events, hosting the 1948 U.S. Open and the PGA Championship in 1983 and 1995. The Swim Stadium was renovated in 2003 and continues to be in use as of 2010.

For the 1984 Summer Olympics, the Coliseum and the Rose Bowl were used as venues.

Participating nations

A total of 37 nations were represented at the 1932 Games. Colombia made its first appearance at the Olympic Games, and the Republic of China competed for the first time after its failed appearance at the 1924 Games.

Number of athletes by National Olympic Committees
<noinclude>

Medal count

These are the top ten nations that won medals at the 1932 Games.

See also

Notes

References

Bibliography

External links

 
Summer Olympics in Los Angeles
Summer Olympics by year
Olympics
Olympics
Olympics, Summer
Olympics
July 1932 sports events
August 1932 sports events